Marie Lund is a Swedish ski-orienteering competitor.

She won individual silver medal in the middle distance at the 2004 World Ski Orienteering Championships in Östersund, finished 5th in the sprint, and received a bronze medal in the relay.

At the 2005 World Ski Orienteering Championships she won a silver medal with the Swedish relay team, which consisted of herself, Ingela Jönsson and Stina Grenholm, and she finished 5th in the sprint, 5th in the long, and 6th in the middle course.

Lund finished overall 3rd in the World Cup in Ski Orienteering in 2006.

References

Year of birth missing (living people)
Living people
Swedish orienteers
Female orienteers
Ski-orienteers
21st-century Swedish women